Chup! (literal English translation: Hush!)  is the debut album by the Pakistani female pop duo Zeb and Haniya, released in July 2008. The only single from this album is "Aitebar".

Concept 
All the songs  are sung in Urdu, except for "Paimana Bitte" which is sung in  Pashto and Dari. The sole single from the album is "Aitebar", which is accompanied by a music video, directed by Saqib Malik.

Track listing 
All music written & composed by Haniya Aslam.

Personnel 
All information is taken from the CD.

Zeb and Haniya
 Zebunnisa Bangash: lead vocals
 Haniya Aslam: guitars, vocals

Additional musicians
 Guitars and Bass: Shallum Asher Xavier, Omran Shafique, Hamza Jafri, Sameer Ahmad and Kamran Zafar
 Drums and Percussion: John "Gumby" Louis Pinto and Sikander Mufti
 Flute: Mohammad Ahsan Papu
 Trumpet and Goat Horn: Hildegunn Øiseth

Production
 Produced by Mekaal Hasan
 Recorded & Mixed at Digital Fidelity Studio, Lahore, Punjab

References

External links 
 Official Website

2008 debut albums
Zeb and Haniya albums
Urdu-language albums